Leśniewski (feminine Leśniewska) is a Polish surname. Notable people with the surname include:

 Marek Leśniewski (born 1963), Polish cyclist
 Stanisław Leśniewski (1886–1939), Polish mathematician, philosopher, and logician

Polish-language surnames